Naoum Blinder (July 19, 1889 – November 21, 1965) was a Russian-American virtuoso violinist and teacher, born in Yevpatoria (then Russian Empire, now Ukraine).

Early life and education
He graduated from the Imperial Musical College of Odessa at 16, where he studied with Alexander Fiedemann. From 1910 to 1913, he attended the Royal Manchester College of Music, where he studied with Adolph Brodsky. He then returned to Odessa to teach at the Imperial Conservatory of Odessa, which he did until 1920.

Violinist career
In 1921 Blinder embarked on a concert tour that included stops in Ukraine, Turkmenistan, Leningrad, Moscow among others. In 1926 he went on tour again, this time playing in Turkey, and Palestine and Siberia.

In 1928 Blinder played seven concerts in Tokyo and twenty three other concerts in other Japanese cities. Following this tour, he moved to the United States and began recording for Columbia Records in New York. From 1929 to 1931 Blinder and his wife and daughter remained in New York while he taught at the Juilliard School. Around this time, Blinder's teenage daughter died of tuberculosis.

In 1931, Issay Dobrowen offered Blinder the concertmaster position at the San Francisco Symphony Orchestra. He accepted and moved to San Francisco where he also played under Pierre Monteux and Enrique Jorda. He stayed with the orchestra until eyesight problems forced him to retire in 1957. Blinder also played as a soloist with many orchestras around the country. He co-founded the San Francisco String Quartet (1935), which included members of the orchestra, including his cellist brother, Boris.

Teaching
Blinder was a noted violin teacher as well. His most prominent student was one of the most critically acclaimed violinists of the twentieth century, Isaac Stern. At one point, his students included 17 members of the San Francisco Symphony Orchestra, and the whole first violin section of the Oakland Symphony Orchestra. Other students of Blinder have had distinguished careers including David Abel, Austin Reller, and Glenn Dicterow, who was the concertmaster of the New York Philharmonic.

Blinder died in San Francisco on November 21, 1965, of heart failure, aged 76 years.

Violins Used
Giovanni Battista Guadagnini, violin	1753c	ex-Rauer	1933 	 	 	

Giovanni Battista Guadagnini,	violin	1774	ex-Blinder	 	 	 	

Jean Baptiste Vuillaume,	violin	1845-50	ex-Blinder

References 

 Roth, Henry. Great Violinists in Performance. Critical Evaluations of over 100 Twentieth-Century Virtuosi, Panjamdrum Books, 1987.
 Saleski, Gdal. Famous Musicians of Jewish Origin, Bloch Publishing Company, 1949.
 Sendrey, Alfred. Bibliography of Jewish Music, Columbia University Press, 1951.
 Vodarsky-Shiraeff, Alexandria. Russian Composers and Musicians. A biographical Dictionary, H. W. Wilson, 1940.
 Wier, Albert E. The Macmillan Encyclopedia of Music and Musicians in One Volume, Macmillan and Co., 1938.

Notes

External links 
 Online Archive of California

Classical violinists from the Russian Empire
Male classical violinists
Soviet classical violinists
20th-century classical violinists
Jewish classical musicians
Jewish American classical musicians
Jews from the Russian Empire
Soviet Jews
1889 births
1965 deaths
People from Yevpatoria
Soviet emigrants to the United States
20th-century American male musicians
20th-century American violinists